In mathematics, especially ring theory, the class of Frobenius rings and their generalizations are the extension of work done on Frobenius algebras.  Perhaps the most important generalization is that of quasi-Frobenius rings (QF rings), which are in turn generalized by right pseudo-Frobenius rings (PF rings) and right finitely pseudo-Frobenius rings (FPF rings).  Other diverse generalizations of quasi-Frobenius rings include QF-1, QF-2 and QF-3 rings.

These types of rings can be viewed as descendants of algebras examined by Georg Frobenius.  A partial list of pioneers in quasi-Frobenius rings includes R. Brauer, K. Morita, T. Nakayama, C. J. Nesbitt, and R. M. Thrall.

Definitions
A ring R is quasi-Frobenius if and only if R satisfies any of the following equivalent conditions:
 R is Noetherian on one side and self-injective on one side.
 R is Artinian on a side and self-injective on a side.
 All right (or all left) R modules which are projective are also injective.
 All right (or all left) R modules which are injective are also projective.

A Frobenius ring R is one satisfying any of the following equivalent conditions.  Let J=J(R) be the Jacobson radical of R.
 R is quasi-Frobenius and the socle  as right R modules.
 As right R modules , and as left R modules .

For a commutative ring R, the following are equivalent:
 R is Frobenius
 R is quasi-Frobenius
 R is a finite direct sum of local artinian rings which have unique minimal ideals.  (Such rings are examples of "zero-dimensional Gorenstein local rings".)

A ring R is right pseudo-Frobenius if any of the following equivalent conditions are met:
 Every faithful right R module is a generator for the category of right R modules.
 R is right self-injective and is a cogenerator of Mod-R.
 R is right self-injective and is finitely cogenerated as a right R module.
 R is right self-injective and a right Kasch ring.
 R is right self-injective, semilocal and the socle soc(RR) is an essential submodule of R.
 R is a cogenerator of Mod-R and is a left Kasch ring.

A ring R is right finitely pseudo-Frobenius if and only if every finitely generated faithful right R module is a generator of Mod-R.

Thrall's QF-1,2,3 generalizations
In the seminal article , R. M. Thrall focused on three specific properties of (finite-dimensional) QF algebras and studied them in isolation.  With additional assumptions, these definitions can also be used to generalize QF rings.  A few other mathematicians pioneering these generalizations included K. Morita and H. Tachikawa.

Following , let R be a left or right Artinian ring:
R is QF-1 if all faithful left modules and faithful right modules are balanced modules.  
R is QF-2 if each indecomposable projective right module and each indecomposable projective left module has a unique minimal submodule. (I.e. they have simple socles.)
R is QF-3 if the injective hulls E(RR) and E(RR) are both projective modules.

The numbering scheme does not necessarily outline a hierarchy. Under more lax conditions, these three classes of rings may not contain each other.  Under the assumption that R is left or right Artinian however, QF-2 rings are QF-3.  There is even an example of a QF-1 and QF-3 ring which is not QF-2.

Examples
Every Frobenius k algebra is a Frobenius ring.
Every semisimple ring is quasi-Frobenius, since all modules are projective and injective.  Even more is true however: semisimple rings are all Frobenius.  This is easily verified by the definition, since for semisimple rings  and J = rad(R) = 0.
The quotient ring  is QF for any positive integer n>1.
Commutative Artinian serial rings are all Frobenius, and in fact have the additional property that every quotient ring R/I is also Frobenius.  It turns out that among commutative Artinian rings, the serial rings are exactly the rings whose (nonzero) quotients are all  Frobenius.
Many exotic PF and FPF rings can be found as examples in

See also
Quasi-Frobenius Lie algebra

Notes
The definitions for QF, PF and FPF are easily seen to be categorical properties, and so they are preserved by Morita equivalence,  however being a Frobenius ring is not preserved.

For one-sided Noetherian rings the conditions of left or right PF both coincide with QF, but FPF rings are still distinct.

A finite-dimensional algebra R over a field k is a Frobenius k-algebra if and only if R is a Frobenius ring.

QF rings have the property that all of their modules can be embedded in a free R module.  This can be seen in the following way.  A module M embeds into its injective hull E(M), which is now also projective.  As a projective module, E(M) is a summand of a free module F, and so E(M) embeds in F with the inclusion map.  By composing these two maps, M is embedded in F.

Textbooks

References

For QF-1, QF-2, QF-3 rings:

Module theory
Ring theory